Timothy ("Tim") Paul Neesham (born 20 October 1979 in Fremantle, Western Australia) is an Australian water polo player.  Neesham was part of Australia's Olympic squad for the 2000 Summer Olympics in Sydney and for the 2004 Summer Olympics in Athens.  He was also a member of the Australian squad that finished 10th at the 2001 World Championships in Fukuoka and placed second at the 2002 Commonwealth Games in Manchester.

Neesham is a graduate of Aquinas College, Perth.

External links
 

1979 births
Living people
Australian male water polo players
Water polo players at the 2000 Summer Olympics
Water polo players at the 2004 Summer Olympics
Water polo players at the 2008 Summer Olympics
People educated at Aquinas College, Perth
Olympic water polo players of Australia
Sportspeople from Fremantle